Power of two or variations may refer to:
Power of two, a number of the form 2n, meaning 2 multiplied by itself n times
The Power of Two, a 2009 album by Michael Feinstein and Cheyenne Jackson
"Power of Two" (song), a song by the Indigo Girls
Power of 2 (book), a partnership book by Rodd Wagner and Gale Muller
"The Power of Two" (Charmed episode), an episode of the television series Charmed
The Power of Two, the first book in the novel series Twitches by H. B. Gilmour and Randi Reisfeld
Epic Mickey 2: The Power of Two, a 2012 video game produced by Junction Point Studios
Max & Paddy's The Power of Two, a DVD release from the television show Max and Paddy's Road to Nowhere